Kerry Hotel Hong Kong is a five-star hotel in Hong Kong. It is located in Hung Hom Bay, Kowloon peninsula. Opened in 2017, it is managed by Shangri-La Hotels and Resorts.

History 
On 28 April 2017, the Kerry Hotel Hong Kong opened.

Design 
Kerry Hotel Hong Kong was designed by André Fu.

Gallery

References

External links
 Shangri-La Hotels and Resorts Announces Kerry Hotel, Hong Kong to Open in December 2016 at luxurytravelmagazine.com

Hotels in Hong Kong
Hung Hom
Hotels established in 2017
Hotel buildings completed in 2017
Kowloon City District